The Red Pyramid, also called the North Pyramid, is the largest of the pyramids located at the Dahshur necropolis in Cairo, Egypt. Named for the rusty reddish hue of its red limestone stones, it is also the third largest Egyptian pyramid, after those of Khufu and Khafre at Giza. It is also believed to be Egypt's first successful attempt at constructing a "true" smooth-sided pyramid. Local residents refer to the Red Pyramid as el-heram el-watwaat, meaning the Bat Pyramid.

The Red Pyramid was not always red. It used to be cased with white Tura limestone, but only a few of these stones now remain at the pyramid's base, at the corner. During the Middle Ages much of the white Tura limestone was taken for buildings in Cairo, revealing the red limestone beneath.

History

The Red Pyramid was the third pyramid built by Old Kingdom Pharaoh Sneferu, and was built 2575–2551 BCE. The Red Pyramid is located approximately one kilometer to the north of the Bent Pyramid. It is built at the same shallow 43 degree angle as the upper section of the Bent Pyramid, which gives it a noticeably squat appearance compared to other Egyptian pyramids of comparable scale. Construction is believed to have begun during the thirtieth year of Sneferu's reign (c. 2590 BCE). Egyptologists disagree on the length of time it took to construct. Based on quarry marks found at various phases of construction, Rainer Stadelmann estimates the time of completion to be approximately 17 years while Rolf Krauss, based on this same graffiti, suggests a period of construction of 10–11 years, an estimate later supported by John Romer.

Archaeologists speculate its design may be an outcome of engineering crises experienced during the construction of Sneferu's two earlier pyramids. The first of these, the Pyramid at Meidum, collapsed in antiquity, while the second, the Bent Pyramid, had the angle of its inclination dramatically altered from 54 to 43 degrees part-way through construction.

Some archaeologists now believe that the Meidum pyramid was the first attempt at building a smooth-sided pyramid, and that it may have collapsed when construction of the Bent Pyramid was already well under way – and that the pyramid may by then have already begun to show alarming signs of instability itself, as evident by the presence of large timber beams supporting its inner chambers. The outcome of this was the change in inclination of the Bent Pyramid, and the commencement of the later Red Pyramid at an inclination known to be less susceptible to instability and therefore less susceptible to catastrophic collapse.

Modern day

A rare pyramidion, or capstone, for the Red Pyramid has been uncovered and reconstructed, and is now on display at Dahshur. However, whether it was actually ever used is unclear, as its angle of inclination differs from that of the pyramid for which it was apparently intended.

The Red Pyramid, along with the Bent Pyramid, was closed to tourists for many years because of a nearby army camp. It is now usually open for tourists and a somewhat intrusive ventilation has been installed which pipes air down the entrance shaft to the interior chambers. Visitors climb steps cut in or built over the stones of the pyramid to an entrance high on the north side. At the southern end of the chamber, but offset to the west, another short horizontal passage leads into the second chamber. This passage was probably closed at one time and the offset was a measure intended to confuse potential robbers.

The second chamber is similar to the first and lies directly beneath the apex of the pyramid. High in the southern wall of the chamber is an entrance, now reached by a large wooden staircase built for the convenience of tourists. The first two chambers have their long axis aligned north-south, but this chamber's long axis is aligned east-west. Unlike the first two chambers, which have fine smooth floors on the same level as the passages, the floor of the third chamber is very rough and sunk below the level of the access passage. It is believed that this is the work of robbers searching for treasure in what is thought to have been the burial chamber of the pyramid.

Gallery

See also

List of tallest freestanding structures
List of Egyptian pyramids
List of megalithic sites
List of tallest structures built before the 20th century

References

Sources

Further reading
 Verner, Miroslav, "The PyramidsTheir Archaeology and History", Atlantic Books, 2001,

External links
The Red Pyramid of Snofru

Buildings and structures completed in the 26th century BC
Dahshur
Pyramids of the Fourth Dynasty of Egypt
Former world's tallest buildings
Sneferu